Woodruff Block is a historic commercial building located at Oswego in Oswego County, New York.  It is a four-story masonry structure built about 1840 and modified between 1900 and 1930. It features rectangular cut stone columns with Doric capitals in the Greek Revival style.  When built it was located strategically at the terminus of the 1828 Oswego Canal.

It was listed on the National Register of Historic Places in 1995.

References

Commercial buildings on the National Register of Historic Places in New York (state)
Commercial buildings completed in 1840
Buildings and structures in Oswego County, New York
National Register of Historic Places in Oswego County, New York